C More Hits is a Scandinavian premium television channel showing movies and TV shows. The channel shows big blockbusters, independent movies, classic movies, movies from the whole world and erotic movies.

The channel was launched as Canal+ Film 2 on 1 May 2004. On 1 November 2007 it changed its name to Canal+ Hits as part of a larger reorganization of the Canal+ channels.

In the Swedish feed, it timeshares with Canal+ Sport 2 which broadcasts a few games in the weekend. In the Norwegian and Finnish network the channel is however broadcast in full.

The channel changed name to C More Hits on 4 September 2012 as of big rebranding.

See also 
 C More Entertainment
 C More First
 C More Action
 C More Sport
 C More Tennis

Pan-Nordic television channels
TV4 AB
Television stations in Denmark
Television channels in Sweden
Television channels and stations established in 2004